Highway 913 is a provincial highway in the Canadian province of Saskatchewan. It runs from Highway 120 to Highway 106. Highway 106 is commonly called the Hanson Lake Road. The southern terminus of the highway is 9.9 kilometres north of Candle Lake Provincial Park, and the northern terminus is within the  Narrow Hills Provincial Park and 15.2 kilometres north from the Narrow Hills Provincial Park campground area. The highway is gravel for its whole length.

The area is entirely boreal forest sporting evergreens, poplar and birch along the route. The highway begins by circumventing the western perimeter of White Gull Lake and then meanders around the south-eastern coastline of Whiteswan Lakes before turning east into the Cub Hills. White Swan Lake is home to a provincial recreation site, White Swan Lake Resort, Nature's Haven Lodge and cottages. The highway ends in the heart of Narrow Hills Provincial Park.

Route description 
Route 913 begins at an intersection with Highway 120 south of White Gull Lake. From there, it enters the Cub Hills and heads north past the west side of White Gull Lake towards the Whiteswan Lakes and Whiteswan Lake (Whelan Bay) Recreation Site at Whelan Bay. After passing by Whelan Bay, Highway 913 passes by Pinkney Lake and turns to the north-east and intersects with Highway 912 east of Piprell Lake. The two roads become concurrent and head east towards Highway 106 and Narrow Hills Provincial Park.

Major intersections

See also 
Roads in Saskatchewan
Transportation in Saskatchewan

References

External links 
Hanson Lake Highway Travel Itinerary

913